Robert Joseph Carroll (16 June 1877 – 7 February 1940) was an Australian politician. He was a Labor member of the Queensland Legislative Council from 1920 until its abolition in 1922.

References

1876 births
1940 deaths
Members of the Queensland Legislative Council
Place of birth missing
Australian Labor Party members of the Parliament of Queensland
Irish emigrants to Australia (before 1923)